Dueling Creek is a tributary of the Anacostia River in southern Maryland in the United States, located in the town of Colmar Manor.

The Bladensburg Dueling Grounds on the creek was a favorite spot for duels in the 19th Century, and was the site of a duel between Stephen Decatur and James Barron.

See also
 Bladensburg Dueling Grounds
 List of rivers of Maryland

References

Anacostia River
Rivers of Prince George's County, Maryland
Rivers of Maryland